16–22 Coney Street is a terrace of shops in the city centre of York, in England.

The terrace was built in about 1500 as three timber-framed houses, with their gable ends facing onto Coney Street.  In the 18th century, the windows were altered, and the front was plastered over. In the 19th century, a brick extension was added at the rear of 20 and 22 Coney Street. At that time, numbers 16 and 18 were a well-known bookshop run by Henry Sotheran.

In 1927, 16 and 18 Coney Street were renovated, with the plaster removed, new windows added in a historic style, and an extension added at the rear. In 1960, they were renovated again, and modern-style windows put in.  In 1954, the whole terrace was Grade II* listed.

Inside, 16 and 18 have an early-19th-century staircase. Number 20 has many early-19th-century fittings and a fireplace surround from the second quarter of the 18th century. Number 22 has two early-17th-century doors. Its upper floors are accessed by a staircase in 24 Coney Street, which is 18th century.

References

Coney Street
Coney Street 16
Timber framed buildings in Yorkshire